Sundarpur is a village at Jiwachhghat Bus stand in Darbhanga district of Bihar stare in India. It is located 10 km from Darbhanga on National Highway 57 (NH 57). It is 108 km from Bihar's capital city Patna.

Nearest villages
Besides Jiwachhghat, Kharua, Islam Pur, Loam, Muria, Adalpur, Bijuli, Dularpur, Atihar, Balha, Basudeopur, Dhoi, Khutwara, Belhi, Chhatwan, Tarsarai, Andhari, Mukrampoor and many other villages are in Darbhanga Tehsil.

Geography
It is 10 km from Darbhanga on NH 57 in Bihar.

Schools
 Janta high school Jiwachhghat (Darbhanga)
 Rajkiye Prathmik Vidyalay, Sundarpur 
 Rajkiye Madhyay Vidyalay, Kharua

Nearest Railway Station
 Tarsarai Railway Station.

Nearest Airport
Patna Airport

Villages in Darbhanga district